Cord Meyer Jr. (November 10, 1920 – March 13, 2001) was a US Central Intelligence Agency (CIA) official. After serving in World War II as a Marine officer in the Pacific War, where he was both injured and decorated, he led the United World Federalists in the years after the war. Around 1949, he began working for the CIA, where he became a high-level operative, retiring in 1977. After retiring from intelligence work in 1977, Meyer wrote as a columnist and book author.

Meyer was married to Mary Pinchot from 1945 to 1958 who was later romantically linked to President John F. Kennedy.

Early life
Meyer was the son of a wealthy New York family. His father, Cord Meyer Sr., was a diplomat and real estate developer; his mother, Katherine Blair Thaw, belonged to a Pennsylvania family that earned its wealth in the coal business. His grandfather, also called Cord Meyer, was a property developer and a chairman of the New York State Democratic Committee. 

He was educated at St. Paul's School, New Hampshire, and attended Yale University, where he was a member of the Scroll and Key society, and as a senior was awarded the Alpheus Henry Snow Prize. After graduating in 1942, he joined the 22nd Marine Regiment and fought in Pacific War; he took part in the Battle of Eniwetok, and in the Battle of Guam as platoon leader, losing his left eye in a grenade attack. He became a first lieutenant and was awarded the Bronze Star Medal. He shared his war experiences, writing for The Atlantic Monthly.

On April 19, 1945, in New York City, he married Mary Eno Pinchot, second daughter of Amos Pinchot.

He was an aide of Harold Stassen to the 1945 San Francisco United Nations Conference on International Organization, and in 1947, was elected president of the United World Federalists, the organization he helped to fund.

CIA career

Circa 1949, Meyer started working for the Central Intelligence Agency, joining the organization in 1951 at the invitation of Allen Dulles. At first he worked at the Office of Policy Coordination under former OSS man, Frank Wisner. In 1953, Meyer came under attack by the Federal Bureau of Investigation (FBI), which claimed he was a security risk for having once stood at the same podium of a "notorious leftist", and refused to give him a security clearance. An internal CIA inquiry summarily dismissed the claims.

According to Deborah Davis in her 1979 book Katharine the Great, Meyer became the "principal operative" of Operation Mockingbird, an alleged plan to secretly influence domestic and foreign media. Meyer befriended James Angleton, who in 1954 became the CIA's counter-intelligence chief. From 1954 until 1962, Meyer led the agency's International Organizations Division. Meyer headed the Covert Action Staff of the Directorate of Plans from 1962.

On 18 December 1956, Meyer's nine-year-old son, Michael, was hit by a car and killed. Meyer and his wife Mary divorced in 1958. On 12 October 1964, his former wife Mary was shot dead by an unknown assailant alongside the Chesapeake and Ohio Canal.  Her sister and brother-in-law Benjamin C. Bradlee, later the executive editor of The Washington Post, caught Angleton breaking into Pinchot's residence. Angleton apparently was looking for Mary Meyer's diary that allegedly contained details of a love affair with John F. Kennedy, the recently assassinated U.S. President.

From 1967 to 1973, Meyer was Assistant Deputy Director of Plans under Thomas Karamessines, and from 1973 to 1976 was CIA station chief in London.

Later years
He retired from the CIA in 1977. Following retirement, Meyer became a syndicated columnist and wrote several books, including an autobiography. Some insiders incorrectly suspected that Cord Meyer was Deep Throat, a key informant in the Watergate Scandal.

Meyer died of lymphoma on March 13, 2001.

Allegations of involvement in the assassination of John F. Kennedy
After the death of former CIA agent and Watergate figure E. Howard Hunt in 2007, Saint John Hunt and David Hunt revealed that their father had recorded several claims about himself and others being involved in a conspiracy to assassinate John F. Kennedy. In the April 5, 2007 issue of Rolling Stone, Saint John Hunt detailed a number of individuals implicated by his father including Meyer, as well as Lyndon B. Johnson, David Sánchez Morales, David Phillips, Frank Sturgis, an assassin he termed "French gunman grassy knoll" who many presume was Lucien Sarti, and William Harvey. The two sons alleged that their father cut the information from his memoirs, "American Spy: My Secret History in the CIA, Watergate and Beyond", to avoid possible perjury charges. According to Hunt's widow and other children, the two sons took advantage of Hunt's loss of lucidity by coaching and exploiting him for financial gain. The Los Angeles Times said they examined the materials offered by the sons to support the story and found them to be "inconclusive".

Books
 Peace or Anarchy, Little, Brown (1948).
 The Search of Security, World Government House (January 1, 1947).
 Facing Reality: From World Federalism to the CIA, University Press of America; Reprint edition (September 2, 1982).

References

External links
 Meyer as Deep Throat suspect

1920 births
2001 deaths
American Jews
American people with disabilities
American spies
Deaths from lymphoma
People of the Central Intelligence Agency
People associated with the assassination of John F. Kennedy
Pinchot family
United States Marine Corps officers
United States Marine Corps personnel of World War II
World federalist activists
Yale University alumni